Charles Drake Martin (August 5, 1829 – August 27, 1911) was an American lawyer, jurist, and politician who served one term as a U.S. Representative for Ohio from 1859 to 1861.

Biography 
Born in Mount Vernon, Ohio, Martin attended the public schools and Kenyon College, Gambier, Ohio. He studied law. He was admitted to the bar in 1850 and commenced practice in Lancaster, Ohio.

Martin was elected as a Democrat to the Thirty-sixth Congress (March 4, 1859 – March 3, 1861). He was an unsuccessful candidate for re-election in 1860 to the Thirty-seventh Congress. He resumed the practice of law. He served as member of the Supreme Court Commission of Ohio 1883–1885. He continued the practice of law in Lancaster, Ohio, until his death there August 27, 1911. He was interred in Forest Rose Cemetery.

Sources

External links
Charles Drake Martin entry at The Political Graveyard

1829 births
1911 deaths
Burials in Ohio
Kenyon College alumni
Ohio lawyers
People from Lancaster, Ohio
People from Mount Vernon, Ohio
Members of the Supreme Court Commission of Ohio
19th-century American politicians
19th-century American judges
19th-century American lawyers

Democratic Party members of the United States House of Representatives from Ohio